Knights of the Queen (Italian:I cavalieri della regina) is a 1954 Italian-American swashbuckler based on The Three Musketeers starring Sebastian Cabot. It was shot in Europe.

It later led to a TV series, The Queen's Musketeers or The Three Musketeers. The series debuted in the US in 1956.

The film and some episodes of the TV series were directed by Nathan Juran and Mauro Bolognini. Other episodes were directed by Hugo Fregonese, Frank McDonald and Joseph Lerner.

Cast
Jeffrey Stone as D'Artagnan
Paul Campbell as Aramis
Sebastian Cabot as Porthos
Domenico Modugno as Athos

Feature films
Some of the episodes from the series were edited into a feature film, The King's Musketeers.

References

External links

The Three Musketeers TV series at IMDb
The King's Musketeers at IMDb

1954 films
Films based on The Three Musketeers
Italian swashbuckler films
1950s Italian-language films
Films directed by Mauro Bolognini
Television films as pilots
1950s English-language films
American swashbuckler films
1950s American films
1950s Italian films